Zeynabad Rural District is a rural district (dehestan) in Shal District, Buin Zahra County, Qazvin Province, Iran. At the 2006 census, its population was 3,958, in 876 families.  The rural district has 12 villages.

References 

Rural Districts of Qazvin Province
Buin Zahra County